Björn Phau won in the final 6–4, 6–2, against Simone Bolelli.

Seeds

Draw

Finals

Top half

Bottom half

References
Main Draw
Qualifying Singles

Canella Challenger - Singles